NKT A/S (formerly NKT Holding A/S) is an industrial  holding company with interests in power cables and wires as well as optical components, lasers and crystal fibres.

The company is listed on Nasdaq Copenhagen Copenhagen Stock Exchange and has been so since 1898. In 1991, the company was restructured as a holding company focusing on the core business with international potential.

The company employs approximately 3700 worldwide with production facilities in 10 European countries.

NKT A/S operates in two main business areas:

NKT - power and energy cables  
NKT Photonics - optical lasers, crystal fibres and fiber-optic sensing

History
The company was founded in 1891 by H.P Prior, who would later become chairman of the Danish industry council, under the name of "Nordisk Elektrisk Ledningstraad og Kabel-Fabrik". It quickly expanded, buying up other companies, and in 1898 was named "Nordiske Kabel og Traadfabrik".

Over the next 90 years the company was active in a number of sectors outside the cable industry, including glass, aluminium, steel, nails, fasteners etc. primarily for the Danish market.

In 1990 the current company structure was established. Over the next 10 years, a series of mergers and sell offs were made with the aim of concentrating on a smaller number of core businesses. NKT Holding sold the electricity distribution manufacturer Lauritz Knudsen to Schneider in 1999, the semi-conductor manufacturer GIGA to Intel in 2000, and the underwater pipe manufacturer NKT Flexibles in November 2012.

In September 2016, the NKT Board of Directors announced the intent to split NKT Holding A/S into two separately listed companies, NKT (incl. NKT Photonics) and Nilfisk, as a consequence of the acquisition of ABB HV Cables business. The split took place October 12, 2017.

In 2022, NKT decided to sell NKT Photonics and focus 100% on electricity cales.

Business areas

NKT 
NKT (formerly nkt cables) produces power cables and power cable accessories for the on- and offshore energy sector. NKT is headquartered in Copenhagen, Denmark, and operates globally with a stronghold in Europe. The company's strategic focus is electricity infrastructure for offshore wind farms and the onshore power grid. The other main areas are cables utilities, for construction and building wires.

NKT was founded by Dane Hans Peter Prior in 1891 and became a listed company in the Copenhagen Stock Exchange in 1898. During the next 90 years, the company became one of the largest industrial companies in Denmark, focusing on cable manufacturing as well as electricity, telecommunications and metal products for the Danish market. When the company structure was changed in 1991, NKT continued as a business area within the NKT Group.

In the 1960s, NKT started recycling scrap from cable production in its facility in Stenlille, Denmark. The company introduced lead-free cables and halogen and PVC-free cables as part of a renewed environmental focus in the 1990s.

In 1999 NKT acquired German cable manufacturer Felten & Guilleaume, doubling the production capacity and adding businesses in the Czech Republic, China and Austria. NKT headquarters subsequently moved to Cologne. In 2013, NKT acquired Swedish cable manufacturer Ericsson Cables in Falun, Sweden.

In 2017, NKT acquired Swedish-Swiss High-Voltage Cable Manufacturer, ABB HV Cables from the ABB Group including the high-voltage plant in Karlskrona and the cable-laying vessel NKT Victoria along with offices in Karlskrona, Alingsas and part of the offices in Malmo, Rotterdam and Mannheim.

International operations 
NKT A/S is present all over the world and has production facilities in Denmark, Germany, Sweden, Norway, Poland, the Czech Republic, the Netherlands, Switzerland and England.

Members of the Board of Directors of NKT A/S
Jens Due Olsen, Chairman of the Board of Directors
René Svendsen-Tune, Vice Chairman of the Board of Directors
Jens Maaløe
Nebahat Albayrak
Andreas Nauen
Karla Marianne Lindahl

References

Manufacturing companies of Denmark
Holding companies of Denmark
Companies based in Brøndby Municipality
Companies based in Copenhagen
Danish companies established in 1891
Wire and cable manufacturers
Photonics companies